The North Dakota State Bison men's basketball team is a part of the athletic program at North Dakota State University in Fargo, North Dakota, U.S. They are members of the NCAA Division I and have been part of The Summit League since May 2007.  Home games are played at the Scheels Center which is located on the NDSU campus in Fargo, ND. The team shares a conference rival with the South Dakota State Jackrabbits.  The Bison men's head coach is David Richman.  On March 10, 2009 the Bison made their biggest comeback in school history with a 66–64 win over Oakland University to win the Summit League tournament championship and became the first team since Southwestern Louisiana (now Louisiana-Lafayette) in 1972 to advance to the NCAA Men's Division I Basketball Championship in their first year of eligibility.

Prior to their transition to Division I, the Bison competed in Division II as a member of the North Central Conference.

Head coaches

Postseason history

NCAA Division I Tournament results
The Bison have appeared in four NCAA Division I Tournaments. Their combined record is 2–4. They qualified for the 2020 NCAA tournament, however, the tournament was cancelled amid the COVID-19 pandemic.

From 2011–2015 the round of 64 was known as the second round, Round of 32 was Third round

NCAA Division II Tournament results
The Bison appeared in eight NCAA Division II Tournaments. Their combined record is 8–8.

CBI results
The Bison have appeared in two College Basketball Invitationals (CBI). Their combined record is 0–2.

The Summit League awards

Player of the Year
Ben Woodside (2009)
Taylor Braun (2014)
Lawrence Alexander (2015)

First-Team All-Summit League
Brett Winkelman (2008 & 2009)
Ben Woodside (2008 & 2009)
Taylor Braun (2012–14)
Lawrence Alexander (2015)
Paul Miller (2017)
Vinnie Shahid (2020)
Tyson Ward (2020)
Rocky Kreuser (2021 & 2022)
Sam Griesel (2022)
Grant Nelson (2023)

All-Defensive Team
Tyree Eady (2022)
Grant Nelson (2023)

Newcomer of the Year
Vinnie Shahid (2019)

Sixth Man of the Year
Dexter Werner (2017 & 2018)
Grant Nelson (2021)

All-time statistical leaders

Single-game leaders
 Points: Ben Woodside (60, 2008)
 Assists: David Ryles (16, 1987)
 Rebounds: Gene Gamache (24, 1955), Robert Lauf (24, 1954), Roger Erickson (24, 1960)
 Steals: David Ryles (8, 1986)
 3 point FG made: Jared Samuelson (9, 2018)
 Free Throws made: Ben Woodside (30, 2008)

Single-season leaders
 Points: Ben Woodside (766, 08–09)
 Assists: David Ryles (230, 86–87)
 Rebounds: John Wojtak (298, 70–71)
 Steals: David Ryles (86, 86–87)

Career leaders
 Points: Ben Woodside (2315, 05–09)
 Assists: Jeff Askew (684, 1979–83)
 Rebounds: Brett Winkelman (874, 05–09)
 Steals: David Ryles (275, 1983–87)

Arenas
 Bentson Bunker Fieldhouse (Physical Education Building) 1931–1970
 Bison Sports Arena 1970–2016 
 Scheels Center 2016-Present

References

External links